Events in the year 1867 in Portugal.

Incumbents
Monarch: Louis I
Prime Minister: Joaquim António de Aguiar

Events
Death penalty was abolished for civil crimes except treason in time of war.

Arts and entertainment

Sports

Births

25 January – Adelaide Cabete, women's rights activist (died 1935)
23 March – José Norton de Matos, military officer and politician (died 1955)
24 September – Augusto de Vasconcelos, surgeon, politician and diplomat (died 1951).

Deaths

References

 
1860s in Portugal
Portugal
Years of the 19th century in Portugal
Portugal